Mordellistena exclusa is a species of beetle in the genus Mordellistena of the family Mordellidae. It was described in 1977 by Ermisch and is endemic to Hungary.

References

exclusa
Beetles described in 1977
Endemic fauna of Hungary
Beetles of Europe